The women's 400 metres event at the 1994 Commonwealth Games was held at the Centennial Stadium in Victoria, British Columbia.

Medalists

Results

Heats

Semifinals

Final

References

400
1994
1994 in women's athletics